Blissfield is a civil parish in Northumberland County, New Brunswick, Canada.

For governance purposes it is divided mainly between the village of Doaktown and the Greater Miramichi rural district, with small areas along the eastern and western borders belonging to the incorporated rural communities of Miramichi River Valley and Upper Miramichi, respectively. All are members of the Greater Miramichi Regional Service Commission.

Prior to the 2023 governance reform, the parish was divided between a much smaller village of Doaktown and the local service district of the parish of Blissfield.

Origin of name
Blissfield was named in honour of John Murray Bliss, was Administrator of the province prior to Lieutenant-Governor Howard Douglas's arrival. Neighbouring Blackville Parish was named in honour of William Black, Administrator of the province due to Douglas's absence at the time both parishes were erected.

History
Blissfield was erected in 1830 by the three-way split of Ludlow Parish, Blissfield in the middle and Blackville to the east.

Boundaries
Blissfield Parish is bounded:

 on the north by a line beginning at a point on the York County line near McConnell Brook, then running north 72º east by an astronomic bearing to the northeastern corner of Blackville Parish, a point 537 chains (10.8 kilometres) from the Canadian National Railway line through Quarryville on a line running north 22º west from the mouth of the Renous River;
 on the east by a line running north and south from the mouth of Donnelly Brook, which is on the southern bank of the Southwest Miramichi River west of Upper Blackville Bridge;
 on the south by the Kent and Sunbury County lines;
 on the west by a line running north and south from the mouth of Big Hole Brook, which is on the western edge of Doaktown

Evolution of boundaries
When Blissfield was erected the eastern line extended to the Westmorland County line, putting part of modern Harcourt Parish in Blissfield.

In 1845 the Kent County line was changed to run southwesterly instead of southeasterly, now meeting the line between Queens and Sunbury Counties. A triangle of wilderness at the southeastern corner was transferred to Kent County.

Communities
Communities at least partly within the parish. bold indicates an incorporated municipality; italics indicate a name no longer in official use

 Amostown
 Blissfield
 Gilks
 Grand Lake Road
 Hazelton
  McGraw Brook
 Renous Forks
 Storeytown
  Weaver Siding
  Doaktown
 Russelltown
 South Road Settlement

Bodies of water
Bodies of water at least partly within the parish.

 Bartholomew River
 Cains River
 Dungarvon River
 Gaspereau River
 Renous River
 Southwest Miramichi River
 Devils Back Lake
 Little Lake
 Shakey Lake

Islands
Islands at least partly within the parish.
 Mercury Island
 Pine Island
 Weaver Island
 Brown Bar
 Wasson Bar

Other notable places
Parks, historic sites, and other noteworthy places at least partly within the parish.
 Big Rocky Brook Protected Natural Area
  Doak House Provincial Park
 Doaktown Airport
 Dungarvon Whooper Spring Woodlot Protected Natural Area
 McGraw Brook Picnic Site
 Plaster Rock-Renous Wildlife Management Area

Demographics
Parish population total does not include former incorporated village of Doaktown. Revised census figures based on the 2023 local governance reforms have not been released.

Population
Population trend

Language
Mother tongue (2016)

See also
List of parishes in New Brunswick

Notes

References

Parishes of Northumberland County, New Brunswick
Local service districts of Northumberland County, New Brunswick